Dmytro Bezruk (born 30 March 1996) is a professional Ukrainian football goalkeeper.

Career
Bezruk is a product of FC Chornomorets Youth Sportive School System. His first trainer was Ihor Sokolovskyi.

He made his debut for FC Chornomorets in the game against FC Zorya Luhansk on 16 August 2015 in the Ukrainian Premier League.

References

External links 
 
 

1996 births
Living people
Ukrainian footballers
Ukrainian expatriate footballers
FC Chornomorets Odesa players
Sabah FC (Azerbaijan) players
Association football goalkeepers
Ukrainian Premier League players
Expatriate footballers in Azerbaijan
Ukrainian expatriate sportspeople in Azerbaijan
Sportspeople from Odesa Oblast